Stephen Ikani Ocheni (born 25 June 1959) is a Nigerian, professor of Accounting and the current Minister of State for Labour and Employment, he was nominated by President Muhammadu Buhari on 29th March, 2017; sworn into office on the 26th July, 2017. He was assigned a portfolio on August 16, 2017 and he resumed on August 18, 2017 until his nomination, Ocheni was the Dean of Faculty of Management Sciences, Kogi State University, Anyigba.

References

1959 births
Living people
Nigerian educators